Nina D. Burleigh is an American writer and investigative journalist, the daughter of author Robert Burleigh. She writes books, articles, essays and reviews. Burleigh is a supporter of secular liberalism, and is known for her interest in issues of women's rights.

Early life
Burleigh grew up in San Francisco, Baghdad, and an Amish area of Michigan. Burleigh stated that her family had "rejected institutional religion" by the time she grew up in the 1970s.  "No baptism, no family Bible recording the births, deaths and marriages. My grandfather actively despised churches."

Burleigh earned a bachelor's degree in English from MacMurray College, a master's in English from the University of Chicago, and a master's degree in Public Affairs Reporting from Sangamon State University (now the University of Illinois Springfield) in 1984.

Career

From January 2015 to January 2020, Burleigh was the National Politics Correspondent for Newsweek. Burleigh covered the White House for Time in the 1990s.

In the 2000s, Burleigh was a staff writer at People magazine, covering human interest stories. She wrote "The Bombshell" column for the New York Observer, and was a contributing editor to Elle. She has contributed to numerous magazines and newspapers, including Time magazine, The New York Times, The New Yorker, The Washington Post, Rolling Stone, and The Guardian and websites such as Slate magazine, TomPaine.com, AlterNet, Powell's Salon.com, and GEN/Medium.  She is an occasional blogger at The Huffington Post. She was an adjunct professor of journalism at Columbia University, and a guest lecturer at the University of Agder.

Middle East
Burleigh worked in the Middle East for many years. Topics she covered included the politics of the Israeli settlements for Time Magazine; the emerging effect of Islamists on women in the wake of the Arab Spring for Slate and Time; and the politics and science of biblical archaeology in Israel for the book Unholy Business and for the Los Angeles Times.  She spent several years working on a book about biblical archaeology and forgery in Israel, which was published in 2009 as Unholy Business: A True Tale of Faith, Greed and Forgery in the Holy Land.

Amanda Knox case and Italy
In June 2009, Burleigh and her family moved to the Italian city of Perugia, where Amanda Knox was being tried on a murder charge, to write a book. Burleigh intended the story to be an exploration of young women's experiences and media portrayal in the modern world.  The book was published in 2011 as The Fatal Gift of Beauty: The Trials of Amanda Knox.

Melania Trump
In January 2019, the London Daily Telegraph was forced to apologize and pay "substantial damages" for publishing an article written by Burleigh. The article, titled "The Mystery of Melania", was found to contain numerous fallacies. "[Melania] Trump often refers to opportunists out to advance themselves by disparaging her name and image," Stephanie Grisham, Trump's communications director, said in a statement to CNN. "She will not sit by as people and media outlets make up lies and false assertions in a race for ratings or to sell tabloid headlines."

Burleigh, however, stood by the article in her subsequent book The Golden Handcuffs: The Secret History of Trump’s Women. “ On January 30, 2019 Burleigh's lawyers threatened the Telegraph parent company TMG with a lawsuit:

Personal life

In 1999, Burleigh married Erik Freeland, a freelance photojournalist. The couple live with their two children in New York City.

List of works

Books
 A Very Private Woman: The Life and Unsolved Murder of Mary Meyer (1998): about Mary Pinchot Meyer 
 The Stranger and the Statesman: James Smithson, John Quincy Adams and the Making of America's Greatest Museum (2003) HarperCollins 
 Mirage: Napoleon's Scientists and the Unveiling of Egypt (2008) HarperCollins  about Napoleon's invasion of Egypt. Selected by The New York Times as an editors' choice and by Delta Kappa Gamma Society International for the 2008 Educator's Award.
 Unholy Business: A True Tale of Faith, Greed and Forgery in the Holy Land (2008) HarperCollins  about James Ossuary. Burleigh has lectured on Unholy Business at the Oriental Institute, Chicago. 
 The Fatal Gift of Beauty: The Trials of Amanda Knox (2012) Broadway Books 
 Golden Handcuffs: The Secret History of Trump's Women (October 2018) Gallery Books . Reprinted as The Trump Women: Part of the Deal in 2020.
 Virus: Vaccinations, the CDC, and the Hijacking of America's Response to the Pandemic (2021) Seven Stories Press

Television
 2021 Epstein's Shadow: Ghislaine Maxwell: executive producer of this three-part documentary about Ghislaine Maxwell (she is also in the cast, playing herself).

References

External links
 

  Spartacus Educational profile
HuffingtonPost.com Blog
Alternet Articles
New York Magazine Articles
New York Observer Articles

Year of birth missing (living people)
Living people
American atheists
American freelance journalists
American feminists
American skeptics
American people of Iraqi-Assyrian descent
American women journalists
American women writers
Columbia University faculty
University of Chicago alumni
People from Elgin, Illinois
Journalists from Illinois
American women academics
21st-century American women